Sara Carlsson (born 26 December 1986) is a Swedish curler. She was third for the Swedish team at the 2008 World Junior Curling Championships in Östersund, winning a silver medal. She is third for the Swedish team at the 2010 Ford World Women's Curling Championship in Swift Current, Canada.

In 2017 she was inducted into the Swedish Curling Hall of Fame.

References

External links
 

Living people
1986 births
Swedish female curlers
World curling champions
Swedish curling champions